Gilson Willets (August 10, 1869 - 1922) was a journalist, author, and screenwriter in the United States. He was born in Hempstead, New York. He wrote for Leslie's Weekly, Collier's Weekly and many other publications. He covered the Spanish–American War in Cuba. He traveled widely before becoming a production manager for Pathé. His work includes several film serials.

As a journalist, he covered a plague in India and E. H. Harriman's Harriman Scientific Expedition to Alaska. He was described as the American Guy de Maupassant for his terse writing style.

He wrote about New Mexico in 1905.

He married Daisy Van Der Veer and his son was named Gilson Vander Veer Willets.

Bibliography
His Neighbor's Wife
Anita, Cuban Spy
The Triumph of Yankee Doodle
Workers of the Nation
The Commercial Invasion of Europe
Inside History of the White House
Rulers of the World at Home
The Loves of Twenty and One (1899)
Myster of the Double Cross

Filmography
The Adventures of Kathlyn (1913), a serial co-written  with Harold MacGrath
The Adventures of Ruth (1919), serial
Little Orphant Annie (1918 film)
The Mystery of the Double Cross (1917)
The City of Purple Dreams (1918 film), an adaptation of an Edwin Baird novel
The Tiger's Trail (1919), an adaptation of a story by Arthur B. Reeve
The Garden of Allah (1916 film), an adaptation of a Robert Hichens novel
Hands Up (serial) (1918)
The Bells (1918 film)
The Heart of Texas Ryan (1917)
 The Princess of Patches (1917)
Sweet Alyssum (film), film adaptation
A Change of Administration
The House of a Thousand Candles (1915 film)
In the Days of the Thundering Herd
Who Shall Take My Life?
Ruth of the Range
Beware of Strangers

References

American male screenwriters
American male journalists
1869 births
1922 deaths
People from Hempstead (village), New York
20th-century American male writers
20th-century American screenwriters